Moetai Charles Brotherson (born 22 October 1969) is a French politician who has represented the 3rd constituency of French Polynesia in the National Assembly since 2017. A member of Tavini Huiraatira, he has also served as member of the Assembly of French Polynesia since 2018. Brotherson has been deputy leader of Tavini Huiraatira since 2017 under the leadership of Oscar Temaru.

Early life
A native of Papeete, Brotherson grew up in Punaauia, Tahiti. He has biological and adoptive Tahitian parents. His biological parents lived in Huahine. Brotherson graduated from the École internationale des sciences du traitement de l'information in 1990 with a master's degree in computer science. He then worked in France, Japan, Germany and the United States before returning to Tahiti after the September 11 attacks. He had an appointment in the Twin Towers on the day of the attacks.

In 2007 he published a novel, Le roi absent ("The Absent King"). In 2010 he participated in the O Tahiti Nui Freedom expedition, which sailed a single-hulled Polynesian outrigger canoe from Tahiti to Shanghai.

Political career
After returning to Tahiti Brotherson worked as an advisor in the office of Émile Vernaudon. He was head of the Post and Telecommunications department from 2005 to 2008, and then chief of staff to Vice President of French Polynesia Antony Géros from 2011 to 2013. He later worked as opposition spokesperson.

He was elected as a municipal councillor of Faaa in the 2008 elections. In 2014 he became deputy mayor. He was elected to the French National Assembly in the 2017 French legislative election, becoming the first Tavini Huiraatira politician to serve in that role. As a parliamentarian, he became a member of the Democratic and Republican Left group. As an MP he unsuccessfully promoted a bill seeking lifetime disqualification from office for corrupt politicians and advocated for French Polynesian independence. He also called on the French government to clean up its nuclear weapons test site at Moruroa and to compensate test victims.

He was subsequently elected to the Assembly of French Polynesia for the Windward Islands in the 2018 French Polynesian legislative election.

He was re-elected to the National Assembly in the 2022 French legislative election.

On 10 March 2023 Tāvini Huiraʻatira announced that Brotherson would be their candidate for the presidency in the 2023 French Polynesian legislative election.

References

External links
 

1969 births
Living people
People from Papeete
French Polynesian civil servants
French Polynesian writers
French Polynesian politicians
Tavini Huiraatira politicians
Deputies of the 15th National Assembly of the French Fifth Republic
Deputies of the 16th National Assembly of the French Fifth Republic
Members of the Assembly of French Polynesia
People associated with the September 11 attacks